The Jack Knife Fire was a wildfire five miles north of Kent, Oregon in the United States. The fire was started by lightning on June 20, 2018, around 3:00 pm, just west of the John Day River. The fire burned .

Events

The Jack Knife fire was started on June 20, 2018, by a lightning strike, along the John Day River, five miles north of Kent, Oregon. The fire was one of 70 wildfires started in Oregon due to lightning strikes over a two-day period.

It was contained on July 6.

References

2018 Oregon wildfires
June 2018 events in the United States
Sherman County, Oregon